The Center for Security and Emerging Technology (CSET) is a think tank dedicated to policy analysis at the intersection of national and international security and emerging technologies, based at Georgetown University's School of Foreign Service. CSET's founding director is former director of the Intelligence Advanced Research Projects Activity Jason Gaverick Matheny.

Established in January 2019, CSET has received more than $57,000,000 in funding from the Open Philanthropy Project, the William and Flora Hewlett Foundation and the Public Interest Technology University Network. Its mission is to study the security impacts of emerging technologies, support academic work in security and technology studies, and deliver nonpartisan analysis to the policy community. For its first two years, CSET plans to focus on the intersection of security and artificial intelligence (AI), particularly on national competitiveness, talent and knowledge flows and relationships with other technologies. CSET is the largest center in the U.S. focused on AI and policy.

Public events 
In September 2019, CSET co-hosted the George T. Kalaris Intelligence Conference, which featured speakers from academia, the U.S. government and the private sector.

Publications 
CSET produces a biweekly newsletter, policy.ai. It has published research on various aspects of the intersection between artificial intelligence and security, including changes to the U.S. AI workforce, immigration laws' effect on the AI sector, and technology transfer overseas. Its research output includes policy briefs and longer published reports.

Media coverage 
CSET's staff are regularly featured in various media focused on technology, national security, education, and international affairs, offering congressional testimony, commentary on current events, and details of their research.

References

External links 
 Official website
 The new 30-person research group in DC investigating how emerging technologies could affect national security

Artificial intelligence associations
Think tanks based in Washington, D.C.
Organizations established in 2019
2019 establishments in Washington, D.C.
Georgetown University